Emoly Ann West (born January 6, 1986) is an American beauty pageant titleholder who was crowned Miss Oklahoma 2010 and was fourth runner-up in the Miss America 2011 Pageant on January 15, 2011, in Las Vegas, Nevada.

West competed at Miss Oklahoma as Miss Edmond LibertyFest, and it was her fifth try for the title.  She had previously been second runner-up to Miss Oklahoma 2009 and fourth runner-up to Miss Oklahoma 2008.

At the time of her selection as Miss Oklahoma, West was a senior at the University of Central Oklahoma, majoring in Dance and minoring in Broadcast Journalism.  Her talent is Ballet en Pointe, and she has studied many types of dance, including jazz, tap, lyrical, modern, and hip hop since the age of 4.  She has also been teaching dance since she was 14.  Her platform was Leadership and Character Development.

With her parental family West attends the Memorial Road Church of Christ in Oklahoma City.

References

External links
 

1986 births
Living people
American beauty pageant winners
American members of the Churches of Christ
Miss America 2011 delegates
Miss America Preliminary Swimsuit winners
People from Edmond, Oklahoma
University of Central Oklahoma alumni